Travel Trendz is an Indian traveling show television channel which launched 12 September 2015. The channel is the first travel television channel in India. The channel is currently available only on Dish TV, Tata Sky, Airtel TV, Sun Direct, DD Direct, Big Network, Hatway DTH, Videocan D2H, which is used by the majority of the country. The channel is owned by Zee Entertainment Enterprises, based in Noida, and Mumbai. The channel is yet to launch in 3D.

References

Television stations in Mumbai
Hindi-language television channels in India
Television channels and stations established in 2015
Hindi-language television stations
2015 establishments in Maharashtra